The General Motors second generation, front-wheel drive X-platform was used for compact cars from 1979 to 1985. After front-wheel drive cars had become somewhat mainstream in the North American market, first through foreign imports, and then by American badged but wholly or partially foreign developed cars – for instance the Ford Fiesta and Dodge Omni – GM's 2nd gen X-bodies were the first all-American developed front-wheel drive cars introduced for high-volume, mainstream sales, and initially saw great sales success. They posed an alternative to imported front-wheel drive compacts.

Vehicles using the X-body included:
 1980–1985 Chevrolet Citation
 1980–1984 Oldsmobile Omega
 1980–1984 Pontiac Phoenix
 1980–1985 Buick Skylark

The X platform was replaced by the L-body and N-body platforms, which were derived from the J-body platform.

Mechanical problems
The X-body developed a reputation for poor quality, due to engineering defects and related safety problems. Several changes were made to the car's braking system during the first months of manufacture in 1979. Initial automobile magazine articles about the new car in the autumn of 1979 cited a dangerous tendency for the car to lock the rear wheels on braking; hundreds of complaints involving this behavior, including dozens of accidents, over a dozen injuries and one death triggering a lawsuit, were reported in the first year of manufacture. This led  the US National Highway Traffic Safety Administration to pressure General Motors for remedial action. Despite there being over a million of these automobiles on the road at that point, GM issued a voluntary recall of only the earliest manual transmission models, less than 50,000, declaring no safety involvement, and declining to publicize the recall. In internal documents, later leaked, GM's engineering staff were dubious that this modification to the brake proportioning valve would be sufficient, even for the cars which were subject to the recall, and that further changes to the brake linings and brake drums would be required; that would have raised the cost from $70 a vehicle to $150, in addition to greatly increasing the number of cars involved.

More complaints, accidents, injuries, and lawsuits ensued, including cars which had actually been modified according to the recall and cars from the 1981 model year, causing NHTSA to pressure GM for further action, preferably a recall of all 1.1 million vehicles in the 1980 model year for replacement of the brake proportioning valves, brake linings and drums. GM, however, responded in 1983 with a voluntary recall of only all manual transmission vehicles of that year and the very earliest automatic transmission cars, a total of fewer than 250,000, including those in the first recall. NHTSA sued GM, demanding a recall of the entire 1980 model year, claiming the company had known as far back as 1978 of the cars' dangerous tendency to lock the rear brakes but had provided misleading and incomplete answers to NHTSA's investigation. In 1987, the presiding judge dismissed the suit, ruling that NHTSA had filed it prematurely and without the proper procedure of developing conclusive evidence and holding investigative hearings, relying mainly on anecdotal evidence instead. NHTSA had logged 4,282 complaints, including 1,417 accidents, 427 injuries and 18 fatalities.

Hagerty (Insurance), specializing in classic cars, notes that the X-car was one of the malaziest cars of the Malaise era, doing enormous damage to GM's reputation.

The FWD GM A-body, derived from the X-platform, did not suffer the same reputation problems.

Notes

References

X